... More, probably Richard More (fl. 1402) was an English politician.

Life
Very little is recorded of More, apart from his surname and the year in which he was an MP. It is thought that More is the Richard More who was mainpernor for the 1406 Plympton MPs.

Career
He was a Member of the Parliament of England in 1402 for Plympton Erle, Devon.

References

14th-century births
15th-century deaths
English MPs 1402
Members of the Parliament of England for Plympton Erle